Odd Thomas is a 2013 American mystery thriller film based on Dean Koontz's 2003 novel of the same name. It is directed, written, and co-produced by Stephen Sommers and stars Anton Yelchin as Odd Thomas, with Willem Dafoe as Wyatt Porter, and Addison Timlin as Stormy Llewellyn.

Plot 

Odd Thomas is a psychic who lives in a small town in California. One day, Odd's powers lead him to focus on a strange man who he calls "Fungus Bob" due to his thick green hair. Through his investigation, Odd realizes Bob is planning to do something violent. He reports his suspicion to Chief Porter, who assigns two deputies to follow Fungus Bob.

Odd meets his girlfriend Stormy Llewellyn for dinner in the belfry of a church. He sees Fungus Bob approaching and they flee to the sacristy, which Robertson destroys as they escape. Stormy calls Chief Porter, who finds the church vandalized but no evidence to link it to Robertson. Odd's psychic magnetism leads him and Stormy to a bowling alley, where the bowling shirts from his vision have just become the new uniform. Chief Porter sends Officer Simon Varner to watch the place on Odd's advice.

Odd finds Fungus Bob shot to death in his bathtub, with evidence framing Odd for the murder. He discovers that Bob has been dead for quite some time and deduces that the encounter at the church was with the dead man's restless spirit.

Chief Porter is shot in a home invasion. Odd rushes to the hospital and learns that Porter is alive but in serious condition.

Odd investigates Bob's fatal bullet wound, and finds a tattoo matching Varner's. Odd realizes that Robertson was eliminated by his co-conspirators because Odd had begun to look into him. Odd's powers lead him back to the mall, where Officer Eckles has murdered the mall security staff; Odd disables him with a baseball bat. He discovers Bob's moving van packed with explosives on a timer — apparently part of a plan to kill the shoppers in the mall and arriving first responders. Odd drives it away from the mall, when Varner returns and shoots Odd. Varner clings to the outside of the van, attempting to finish off Odd. Odd jumps from the van as Varner enters the cab, and the van crashes into a man-made canal and explodes, incinerating Varner but killing no one else.

Odd wakes in the hospital to find himself hailed as a local hero. Later, Odd retreats to Stormy's apartment to enjoy uninterrupted time with her. It is revealed that Stormy was killed in the mall shooting. Porter, realizing that Stormy's spirit is staying in this world only for Odd, advises him to let her go. Odd bids her a tearful farewell, promising her that they'll be reunited one day. Then Odd travels to Las Vegas to continue his crusade.

Cast 
 Anton Yelchin as Odd Thomas, the clairvoyant cook with supernatural powers to see the dead. He must destroy the threat to Pico Mundo. Jack Justice plays young Odd Thomas.
 Addison Timlin as Bronwyn "Stormy" Llewellyn, Odd's love interest. She knows about Odd's powers and tries to help him out any way she can. Robin Lanning plays young Stormy.
 Gugu Mbatha-Raw as Viola, a waitress at the restaurant.
 Shuler Hensley as Fungus Bob, a mysterious suspect with mold as hair.
 Leonor Varela as Odd's Mother; seen in only flashbacks who too has the gift of clairvoyance and is committed to a mental hospital by Odd's father.
 Willem Dafoe as Wyatt Porter, the town's police chief who also knows about Odd's powers and helps out Odd in many ways.
 Melissa Ordway as Lysette, a blonde teenager.
 Nico Tortorella as Simon Varner, a police officer who dislikes Odd.
 Kyle McKeever as Bern Eckles, another police officer who works for Wyatt.
 Laurel Harris as Karla Porter, Wyatt's wife.

With cameo appearances by Patton Oswalt as Ozzie, Matthew Page as Harlo Landerson, Morse Bicknel as Kevin Goss, Ashley Sommers as Penny Kalisto, and Arnold Vosloo as Tom Jedd.

Production
Anton Yelchin was attached to star in the film early on. Summers said that Yelchin was his only choice to play Odd Thomas. Early casting announcements included 50 Cent as Shamus Cocobolo as well as Lily Collins and Tim Robbins none of whom ultimately ended up appearing in the film. Production began in May 2011 in Santa Fe, New Mexico and Albuquerque.

Dean Koontz himself enjoyed the film saying "It is so wonderful that I am whacked flat by happiness."

The film wrapped in 2011 but was delayed. In July 2013, it was reported that the release of the film had been delayed because of legal action by Two Out of Ten Productions against Outsource Media Group and others for breach of contract. The suit alleges that $25 million should have been spent on prints and advertising to support a release of Odd Thomas in the U.S., and another $10 million to partially refinance certain loans.

Reception

Critical response
Odd Thomas received mixed reviews from film critics. Rotten Tomatoes gives it a rating of 38% rating based on reviews from 47 critics, with an average score of 5.2/10. The site's critical consensus states: "Anton Yelchin is the right man for the title role, but Odd Thomas suffers from a jumbled tone." Metacritic gives it a score of 45 out of 100, based on reviews from 11 critics, indicating "mixed or average reviews".

Brian Tallerico for RogerEbert.com gave it one and a half stars calling it "a film that's going through the motions with too little character, style, or atmosphere to keep it engaging." Dennis Harvey for Variety said the film "is neither witty nor macabre enough to pull off Koontz’s balance of elements in cinematic terms. So it winds up coming off as just another CGI-laden ride that’s at once overstuffed and undernourished." John DeFore of The Hollywood Reporter found the script felt rushed and while the cast was enjoyable "Odd Thomas just doesn't leave us with much desire to return there."

Drew Taylor for IndieWire gave the film a B and called it "the best Koontz adaptation, by a fairly considerable margin."

Box office
The movie was a box office bomb. It began its theatrical roll-out in the Philippines on July 17, 2013. It debuted at #6 taking in $52,623 from 35 screens. The film ended its two-week run with $118,835. The film opened in Finland where it took in $6,309 from 31 screens for a 14th-place finish. The film grossed a total of $1,321,097 at the international box office.

After having been delayed due to legal disputes, the film had a limited theatrical release in the United States, in February 2014. No domestic box office figures were reported.

Home media 
The film was released on DVD in the UK in February 2014. A German dubbed version was released in December 2013.

It was released on DVD and Blu-ray in the United States on March 25, 2014.

, Odd Thomas was available to watch on Netflix's streaming service in some areas. Odd Thomas, was available on the Hulu and Amazon Prime Video streaming services.

References

External links 
 
 
 

2013 films
2010s English-language films
2010s mystery thriller films
2010s supernatural thriller films
American mystery thriller films
American supernatural thriller films
Films about precognition
Films based on American thriller novels
Films based on works by Dean Koontz
Films directed by Stephen Sommers
Films scored by John Swihart
Films set in California
Films shot in New Mexico
2010s American films